The Advisory Committee on the Virological Safety of Blood, often abbreviated to ACVSB, was a committee formed in March 1989 in the United Kingdom to devise policy and advise ministers and the Department of Health on the safety of blood with respect to viral infections. The scope of the ACVSB concerned areas of significant policy for the whole of the United Kingdom and operated under the terms of reference: "To advise the Health Departments of the UK on measures to ensure the virological safety of blood, whilst maintaining adequate supplies of appropriate quality for both immediate use and for plasma processing." Of particular emphasis to the remit was the testing of blood donors using surrogate markers for Non-A Non-B hepatitis (NANBH) and later on, HCV-screening of blood donors. 

The first meeting took place on 4 April 1989 and was chaired by the (then) Deputy Chief Medical Officer (DCMO), Dr E L Harris. From August 1989, Dr J Metters, also DCMO, sat as chair. The advice to be given by the committee extended to blood products and donor organs as well as blood, and the viral agents to be considered by the group were HIV1 and HIV2, HTLV-I, Non A Non B Hepatitis, CMV, parvovirus and the prion disease Creutzfeldt–Jakob disease (CJD).

Meetings
After the inaugural meeting of 4 April 1989, the advisory committee met a further 13 times, with the fourteenth meeting being held on 29 September 1992. The files and minutes of the committee do not continue beyond February 1993 by which time the ACVSB was considered defunct. Following a memorandum from NHS Management Executive dated 8 February 1993, the ACVSB was replaced by the committee on the Microbiological Safety of Blood and Tissues (MSBT).

Destruction of files
It came to light in 2004 that documentation that fell within the scope of NHS contaminated blood products had gone missing from within the Department of Health and was thought to have been destroyed in the early 1990s. It was claimed by the (then) Minister of State, Lord Warner, that the files in question had been identified by the Department of Health as minutes and background papers of the ACVSB spanning May 1989 to February 1992 and that they were "unfortunately destroyed" having not been properly archived.
In May 2006, it was recorded in Hansard that officials became aware of the destruction of the files as early as April 2000, at which point the Department of Health undertook an internal audit. According to a report in The Times of 13 May 2019, there were 17 volumes of papers generated by the advisory committee during the course of its operation. The investigation by the Department's internal auditors conducted in April 2000 found that of the 17 volumes, 14 had been destroyed and only volumes 1-3 survived. A court disclosure list from the Hepatitis C Litigation dated 9 May 2000 also confirms that ACVSB volumes 4-17 of file series "GEB1" were destroyed at various stages between July 1994 and March 1998.

Key decisions 
A significant decision made by the committee in November 1990 was to recommend to Ministers that routine anti-HCV screening of blood be introduced. However, the ACVSB decision was not implemented until September 1991 which came under criticism in the Final Report of the Penrose Inquiry for having been delayed by 10 months. In 2001, the role of the ACVSB was referred to in the judgment of A and Others v National Blood Authority in that ministerial approval had been given on 21 January 1991, yet the second generation tests were not introduced in England and Wales until 1 September 1991.

During the HIV Haemophilia Litigation, the ACVSB recommended the use of a waiver, or deed of undertaking, aimed at ensuring that the claimants would not be able to litigate against the government if they were found to have contracted any further viruses. It was recorded in Hansard in 2007 that a number of these deeds of undertaking from 1989 were inadvertently destroyed.

See also 
 Contaminated blood scandal in the United Kingdom
 Contaminated haemophilia blood products
 HIV Haemophilia Litigation
 Penrose Inquiry

References 

Hepatitis C
Defunct departments of the Government of the United Kingdom